Austria competed at the 1968 Summer Paralympics in Tel Aviv, Israel from November 4 to 13, 1968. The team finished fifteenth in the medal table and won a total of nineteen medals; two gold, seven silver and ten bronze. Thirty-one Austrian athletes competed at the Games; nineteen men and twelve women.

Athletics

Nineteen of Austria's competitors took part in athletics. Engelbert Rangger won a silver medal in the men's precision javelin with a score of 72. Hermina Kraft placed sixth in the women's event, with a score of 64.

See also 
 Austria at the 1968 Summer Olympics

References

Nations at the 1968 Summer Paralympics
1968
Paralympics